Sanna Irene Malaska (born 6 April 1983) is a Finnish football coach and former midfielder, currently running the female youth teams at HJK Helsinki of the Naisten Liiga. As well as for HJK, she has played for Sunnanå SK of Sweden's Damallsvenskan, Prainsa Zaragoza in the Spanish Superleague and Amazon Grimstad in Norway's Toppserien.

She has been a member of the Finnish national team, taking part in the 2005 and 2009 European Championships. She last appeared in 2010.

References

External links
 
 

1983 births
Living people
Finnish women's footballers
Finland women's international footballers
Expatriate women's footballers in Norway
Expatriate women's footballers in Spain
Expatriate women's footballers in Sweden
Helsingin Jalkapalloklubi (women) players
Kansallinen Liiga players
Footballers from Helsinki
Damallsvenskan players
Primera División (women) players
Finnish expatriate footballers
Sunnanå SK players
Finnish expatriate sportspeople in Spain
Finnish expatriate sportspeople in Sweden
Finnish expatriate sportspeople in Norway
Toppserien players
Zaragoza CFF players
Women's association football defenders
Women's association football midfielders
21st-century Finnish women